An orbiter is a type of a spacecraft.

Orbiter may also refer to:

Space Shuttle orbiter, the main component of the Space Shuttle
Orbiter (simulator), an open source space flight simulator
Orbiter (1985 video game), an educational video game by Spectrum HoloByte
Orbiter (comics), a graphic novel by Warren Ellis
Echo Orbiter, an indie rock group
Orbiter (ride), an amusement park ride
Orbiter (Canada's Wonderland), an HUSS Skylab ride at Canada's Wonderland
 Orbiter 3, see Breitling Orbiter
 Winds Italia Orbiter, an Italian paramotor design
 Orbiter, an electronic music duo on Canadian label Monstercat
Orbiter (internet slang)
Aeronautics Defense Orbiter, an Israeli unmanned aerial vehicle

See also
 Orbital vehicle (disambiguation)
 Orbital (disambiguation)
 Orbit (disambiguation)